The Tetulia Corridor is a proposed  passage that would connect the political subdivision of Chopra in North Dinajpur district to the towns of Jalpaiguri and Mainaguri in Jalpaiguri district in the Indian state of West Bengal, through Tetulia Upazila in Bangladesh. The government of India has taken up the opening of the corridor with the government of Bangladesh.

History

Since the partition of India, the country's only access to its northeast has been the narrow Siliguri Corridor, vulnerable to natural disasters like landslides.  Article VIII of the India-Bangladesh Trade Agreement, signed in 1980, states, "The two governments agree to make mutually beneficial arrangements for the use of their waterways, railways and roadways for commerce between the two countries and for passage of goods between two places in one country through the territory of the other". Based on this provision India allowed a Bangladesh-to-Bangladesh passage called Teen Bigha Corridor through its territory, initially for a limited duration each day, and eventually, through a lease agreement, for 24 hours a day, starting in September 2011. Afterwards, politicians in the region stepped up efforts to persuade Bangladesh to reciprocate and grant access to India through its territory.

The government of Bangladesh has not decided on the issue, and the proposal remains pending. Local leaders demanded that the Indian government initiate negotiations on the issue, and to settle it along with Indo-Bangladesh Land Boundary Agreement.

Benefits
It would thereby likely enhance commerce in the region, as well as facilitating Indian administration of Jalpaiguri district by making it easier to reach from the state capital.

External links
 Map of India-Bangladesh border links

Notes

Geography of Bangladesh
Borders of India
Borders of Bangladesh
Panchagarh District
Geography of Rangpur Division
Geopolitical corridors